C. fallax may refer to:
 Calliphora fallax, a synonym for Calliphora hilli, a fly species
 Clostridium fallax, an anaerobic motile gram-positive bacterium species

See also